Mohammed Michael "Mo" George (born 11 March 1982) is a British actor  who played Gus Smith on the soap opera EastEnders from 2002 to 2008.

Early life
Mohammed Michael George was born to a Jamaican mother and Antiguan father, in Hackney, London, England.

Career
Before appearing in EastEnders, George made guest appearances in Holby City, Bottom (as a young trick-or-treater in the episode Terror), Kidulthood and The Last Detective. He also starred as Dennis in the children's program Renford Rejects in 2000.

Personal life
George has a daughter, Olivia Destiny. His daughter was born in 2005 in Barnet, Greater London.

Legal troubles
George was arrested on 8 December 2006 for a suspected assault on girlfriend Emma Archibald during an argument outside a restaurant. She corroborated the claims, in what started as an argument over who should empty the dishwasher.  George was cautioned by the police for having swung a bag of rubbish, and was subsequently suspended by EastEnders Executive Producer Diederick Santer for two months. He apologised to the BBC and the show's producers.
It was announced on 18 January 2008 that George and EastEnders had reached a mutual agreement not to renew his contract and he left the show after six years, later in 2008.  George has since stated that he was "forced" to leave EastEnders after the bosses there believed newspaper headlines which he later proved wrong.  He has also admitted to suffering from depression as a result of his departure from EastEnders.

Lawsuits
In March 2009, George started libel action against The Sun newspaper, claiming that they said he was "acting like a wild animal" and branded him a "woman beater" and that this was untrue. His lawyer said the reports had "damaged his prospects as an actor". The newspaper contested the claim, but George won £75,000 libel damages on 2 April 2009. In July 2010, the Daily Star apologised and paid damages to George after they incorrectly reported that he had arrived drunk to an EastEnders 25th anniversary party and acted aggressively to the programme's producers.

Other interests
George is now a full-time DJ playing around clubs across the United Kingdom.

In June 2016, George was nominated for best actor alongside Idris Elba, Shone Romulus, and Emmanuel Imani at the 2016 British Urban Film festival for his role in "Murder Capital" a short film written and directed by Rob Woods.

Filmography

Film

Television

References

External links

1982 births
Living people
Male actors from London
Black British male actors
English DJs
English male film actors
English people of Antigua and Barbuda descent
English people of Jamaican descent
English male soap opera actors
People from Hackney Central